Alessandro Genovesi (born 10 January 1973) is an Italian director, screenwriter, playwright and actor.

Life and career 
Born in Milan, Genovesi started his professional career on stage, first as an actor and later as a playwright and a director. He had his breakout in 2007, with the play Happy Family he wrote and directed; the play won several awards, and in 2010 it was adapted in a film with the same title directed by Gabriele Salvatores in which Genovesi served as a screenwriter and an assistant director.

Genovesi made his directorial film debut in 2011 with The Worst Week of My Life, which was a box office success and led to a sequel, still directed by Genovesi.

Filmography 
The Worst Week of My Life (2011) 
The Worst Christmas of My Life (2013)  
Soap Opera (2014)
What a Beautiful Surprise (2015)
My Big Gay Italian Wedding (2018)
When Mom Is Away (2019)
When Mom Is Away... With the Family (2020)
7 Women and a Murder (2021)

References

External links 
 

1973 births
Living people
Italian film directors
Italian theatre directors
Italian screenwriters
Italian male screenwriters
Film people from Milan
Male actors from Milan
Italian male film actors
Italian male stage actors
Italian dramatists and playwrights
Theatre people from Milan